José Luis González Sanjuan, better known by the pen name Fernando Denis, is a Colombian poet and author.  He was born in Cienaga, Magdalena, Colombia, in 1968.

Works
He has written books of poetry: The Invisible creature in the twilight of William Turner (1997), considered one of the best books published in Colombia during the twentieth century, Come to these yellow sands (2004), The Red wine of syllables(2007) and The Geometry of Water (2009). His poetry has begun to generate interest within and outside his country, and his new book, The Geometry of Water, published by Norma, was presented at the Book Fairs in Buenos Aires and in Mainz in 2010 with success.

Paper Museum, engraving and printing of Argentina is being translated into English, French, German and Russian. Contemporaries, between critics and writers as William Ospina (winner of Prize Romulo Gallegos 2008), Juan Gustavo Cobo-Borda and José Ramón Ripoll, agree that Fernando Denis is one of today's most original voices in the poetry of Latin America. He is currently finishing his first novel, expected to be base on his own life.

The Geometry of Water was translated and published in India by Sahitya Akademi in November 2010.

Psychology
"Fernando Denis is the successful result of a happy schizophrenia. On the one hand, from the world's creative craters near the Caribbean Sea and tropical nights to flights to heaven of Remedios the Beauty (Remedios La bella from One hundred years of solitude by Gabriel García Márquez ), the ghosts that evaporate and mangrove swamps. On the other hand, an irresistible fascination for the world of painting, which burns with fire his eyes with work of William Turner, Denis lost his footsteps in the stairs that lead nowhere in the engravings of Piranesi, and definitely went mad with tigers that Jorge Luis Borges imagined blue. His cult purpose: to become a myth of our poetry, oscillating between anger in Bogota Bohemian night and the memory of the Pre-Raphaelite Brotherhood. Ability to dissolve the reason in one color, in music, is one of his disturbing virtues," enthusiastically wrote Juan Gustavo Cobo Borda.

Themes
His poetry is concerned with the exterior landscape, one that contains the colours of nature, and much like the twilight of William Turner, his poems contain magic and fire. The cadence and the sounds of ancient texts have a taste, stuffed with a lot of painting, monologues versatile female voices that rise from the dust to christen the new language. He is currently the most read poet in his country and is the new icon of the new generation in Colombia.

"The most obvious virtue of the poetry of Fernando Denis is originality," wrote William Ospina. "None of us refers to the words with more freedom, so when we read him the most common reader reaction is amazement, bewilderment."

Reviews
In the preface to the Venezuelan edition of his book The sea throws its gold coins, José Ramón Ripoll, musicologist, editor of the Atlantic Magazine and one of the most acclaimed masters of modern Spanish poetry, wrote "Fernando Denis is a versatile poet, dense and full, in the sense that he looks and names the world without fuss, making all his experience in poetic material, from the high peaks of the mountains to the splash of the tread on his shoes puddles."

External links

20th-century Colombian novelists
Colombian male novelists
Colombian male writers
20th-century Colombian poets
Colombian male poets
People from Magdalena Department
1968 births
Living people
21st-century Colombian poets
21st-century male writers
20th-century male writers